Killbilly was a Dallas, Texas-based band active from 1987 to 1994, which described its music as being a mixture of bluegrass and punk. Critics have variously described the band's style as a "fusion of bluegrass and shred metal", and as "a genuine bluegrass band playing straight, fast and loud." The Dallas Observers Robert Wilonsky described the band as "irreplaceable" and their breakup in 1994 as the "end of an era".

History
Killbilly originated in 1986, when its guitarist, Alan Wooley, wrote and recorded the cassette "Foggy Mountain Anarchy" entirely by himself. At the time, Wooley was performing with the punk rock band the White Shapes. He then sent the cassette  to KNON DJ Craig "Niteman" Taylor, who liked it so much that he called Wooley to invite his entire band to come on his show to perform. Wooley then admitted that he had no "band", and that he had recorded the album by himself, to which Taylor replied, given that Taylor knew how to sing and play harmonica, they should make Killbilly a real band. Wooley and Taylor went on to do so. They played their first show on March 12, 1987. The band's lineup changed, but its core members were Wooley, Taylor, singer and banjo player Stephen Trued,  acoustic guitarist, mandolin player, and singer Harris Kirby, bassist Richard Hunter, and drummer Michael Schwedler. After producing cassettes and selling them at shows, they released their major label debut album, Foggy Mountain Anarchy, in June 1992. In 1994, the band released Stranger in this Place on Crystal Clear Records. Like their previous album, Stranger in this Place was internationally distributed. The band broke up due to financial insolvency in 1994, and played their last show on November 4 that year.

Discography

Studio albums
Stranger in this Place (Flying Fish Records, 1992)
Foggy Mountain Anarchy (Crystal Clear Records, 1994)

Cassettes
Alive in the City of Hate in the Lone Star State (4 Dots, 1990)
Bootleg '91 (1991)

References

Musical groups from Dallas
Musical groups established in 1987
Musical groups disestablished in 1994
1987 establishments in Texas
1994 disestablishments in Texas
American bluegrass music groups
Punk rock groups from Texas